Habibullah Khan Karzai is a powerful Afghan leader from the Popalzai clan. He is an elder and considered a leader of the Karzai family. His younger brother, Abdul Ahad Karzai, was the father of President Hamid Karzai.

Habibullah Khan Karzai served as special advisor and speechwriter to King Zahir Shah and accompanied him in the course of the King's state visit to the United States during the Presidency of John F. Kennedy. He has also served as senior envoy from the Afghan Foreign Ministry and Permanent Representative from Afghanistan to the United Nations.  Habibullah Karzai is regarded by many Afghans as a very learned scholar of philosophy and politics.

References

Afghan diplomats
Year of birth missing (living people)
Living people
Habibullah
Permanent Representatives of Afghanistan to the United Nations
Pashtun people
Place of birth missing (living people)
20th-century Afghan politicians
21st-century Afghan politicians